Gračani is a village in the municipality of Ǵorče Petrov, North Macedonia. It is located close to the Kosovan border.

Demographics
The 1981 Yugoslav census recorded 357 Albanians and 1 other inhabiting the village. The 1994 Yugoslav census was the last to record any people as residing in the village which contained 21 inhabitants, all Albanians. The village has experienced heavy depopulation in recent times. According to the 2002 census, the village had 0 inhabitants.

References

External links

Villages in Ǵorče Petrov Municipality
Albanian communities in North Macedonia